Sally Ann Matthews (born 19 September 1970) is an English actress.  She is best known for playing the role  of Jenny Bradley in the ITV soap opera Coronation Street.

Career
Matthews was born in Oldham, Lancashire. She played Jenny Bradley, the daughter of the villainous Alan Bradley (Mark Eden) in Coronation Street from 1986 to 1991, making a brief return in 1993.

In 2005 Matthews joined the cast of Emmerdale as farmer's wife Sandra Briggs, but left less than a year later.  In an interview with Inside Soap, the show's executive producer, Kathleen Beedles, admitted casting Matthews, well-known to soap fans from Coronation Street, in what would essentially become a minor role was a mistake.  She also confirmed she would like Matthews to return to the show in some capacity in the future.

She returned to Coronation Street as Jenny in February 2015.

Personal life
In a one-off documentary Coronation Street's DNA Secrets in September 2018, Matthews found out that fellow Coronation Street actress Amanda Barrie, who played Alma Baldwin (nee Halliwell) (1981–1982, 1988–2001), is her cousin.

Filmography

Theatre
Judy (Lead), Framed, the Mill at Sonning, Ian Masters
Alison, Mum's The Word, UK Tour, Andrew Lynford
Dee, The Business of Murder, UK Tour, Ian Masters
Jean Perkins, Funny Money, UK Tour, Giles Watling
Annie, Table Manners, UK Tour, Ian Dickens
Joanna Lyppiat, Present Laughter, UK Tour, Ian Dickens
Jane, Killing Time, UK Tour, Ian Dickens
Mrs Grose, Turn of the Screw, UK Tour, Ian Dickens
Suzette, Don't Dress for Dinner, UK Tour, Ian Dickens
Mary Magdalene/Singer, The Passion/Doomsday, Northern Broadsides, Barrie Rutter
Lady Montague, Romeo & Juliet, Northern Broadsides, Barrie Rutter
Octavia, Antony & Cleopatra, Northern Broadsides, Barrie Rutter
Michele Gray, Blood Sweat and Tears, Hull Truck, Zoe Seaton
Vicki, My Fat Friend, Oldham, Kenneth Alan Taylor
Stephanie/Stella Turner, Feed, Bill Kenwright Ltd, Kenneth Alan Taylor
Sarah Harding, The Accrington Pals, Bolton Octagon, Sue Sutton Mayo
Raissa, The Suicide, Bolton Octagon, Lawrence Till
Daisy Hannigan, Biloxi Blues, Manchester Library Theatre, David Fleashman

Radio
Iris/Octavia, Antony & Cleopatra (2 years), BBC Radio 4, Kate Rowland
Toni, Carr Lane Carters, BBC Radio 4
Nurse Jameson, MY DAD'S A BORING NERD'', BBC Radio 4, Martin Jameson

References

External links
 
 

1970 births
Living people
English soap opera actresses
English television actresses
English stage actresses
Actresses from Oldham
20th-century English actresses
21st-century English actresses